The Miners' Parade is a parade traditionally held in places in Germany where ore was and is smelted. It was and is a public event held by a community or corporation whose employment is linked to mining and smelting. It is usually known in German as a Bergparade (lit. "Mine Parade"), but also as a Berg- und Hüttenparade (lit. "Mine and Smeltworks Parade"). It takes place as one of the highlights of a festival (but can also be held as a protest march to fight for the redress of abuses). The Miner's Parade is a special form of procession which is organised to march past important dignitaries or which is organized for such high-ranking individuals.

History 
This tradition originated in the Saxon Ore Mountains. It has been performed out in various ways over the centuries. The original miners' and smelters' costumes (Tracht) were superseded by a miner's habit (Berghabit) which frequently changed. After 1768, with the introduction of ranks, district colours and other regulations, the dress of Saxon miners and smelters metallurgy developed a uniform-like character and was actually called a uniform from that time. The format, sequence and occasion for the parades, as well as the number of participants, were and are variable, with between 100 and 3,000 participants being recruited from the mining or smelting works or both.

The format was never standard. The number of participating overseers (Steiger) and officiants (Offiziante), hewers (Hauer) or smelters (Schmelzer) (and, in Freiberg, officials of the Mining Office and student miners) depended on the importance of the parade. The size of the detachments varied between 16 and 48 men, and they almost always marched in 4 ranks (rarely 3, 6 or 8). The number of flags carried, the number and type of mining and smelting tools carried on parade and the officers participating on horseback was variable. The size of the parade also affected the number of miners' bands involved.

Miners' parades have been depicted in art, with paintings, carvings, and cast works portray the subject.

Present day 
Today miners' parades take places on various occasions, such as Christmas markets, folk festivals, and street festivals as well as other celebrations, in the following towns and cities:
 Germany
 Saxony
 Aue, on the 1st Advent
 Annaberg-Buchholz, on the 4th Advent, the largest miners' parade in Germany
 Brand-Erbisdorf, on the 2nd Advent
 Chemnitz, on the Sunday before the 1st Advent
 Dresden, on the Saturday before the 4th Advent at the Lichterfest on Striezelmarkt
 Freiberg, on the Saturday before the 2nd Advent, Mettenschicht
 Geyer, on the 4th Advent
 Lößnitz, on the 3rd Advent
 Marienberg, on the 3rd Advent
 Schneeberg, on 22 Jul, on Bergstreittag and on the 2nd Advent
 Schwarzenberg, on the Saturday before the 3rd Advent
 Seiffen, on the Saturdays before the 1st and 3rd Advents, with "living toys"
 Stollberg, on the Saturday before the 3rd Advent
 Thum, on the 1st Advent
 Zwönitz, on the Saturday before the 1st Advent as a prelude to the Smelting Days (Hutzentage)
 Zwickau, on the Saturday before the 2nd Advent
 North Rhine-Westphalia
 Bochum, German Mining Museum, Bochumer Knappentag
 Lower Saxony
 Goslar
 Rhineland-Palatinate
 Fell (Mosel)
 Thomm (near Trier)
 Saxony-Anhalt
 Bad Suderode, on the 3rd Advent

Literature 
 Berufsfachschule für Tourismus Chemnitz (pub.): Bergparaden im Sächsischen Erzgebirge. Schriftenreihe Erzgebirgische Volkskunst, Vol. 10. Husum Verlag, Husum, 2000,

See also

External links 

The HFBHK Miners' Parade
https://archive.today/20001008020112/http://www.tira.de/ANA/ana_begp.htm
Photographs of miners' parades in past years (not only) in the Ore Mountains
 8 Videos of the Christmas miners' parade in Seiffen in 2006
Miners' parades in Fell and Thomm (Mosel/Schieferbergbau): text, photos, 10 min video
Historic photographs of the 1719 miners parade near Dresden

German traditions
Mining culture and traditions
Culture of Saxony
History of mining in Germany
Culture of the Ore Mountains